Ana de Velasco y Téllez-Girón (1585 – 7 November 1607) was a Spanish noblewoman and mother of John IV of Portugal, the first Portuguese King of the Braganza Dynasty.

She was the daughter of Juan Fernández de Velasco, 5th Duke of Frías and Maria Tellez-Giron, daughter of Andalusian Duke of Osuna, Pedro Téllez-Girón, 1st Duke of Osuna

Marriage and issue
She married on 17 June 1603, Teodósio II, Duke of Braganza and had 4 children:
 John II, 8th Duke of Bragança (1604–1656), crowned King as John IV of Portugal on 1 December 1640;
 Edward of Braganza (1605–1649), Lord of Vila do Conde;
 Catherine of Braganza (1606–1610);
 Alexandre of Braganza (1607–1637);

She died in Vila Viçosa at the age of 22.

Ancestry

External links
 geneall

1585 births
1607 deaths
Ana
Ana
Ana
Portuguese people of Italian descent